Mihai Răzvan Teja (born 22 September 1978) is a Romanian professional football manager and former player.

Club career
After Teja finished his youth years at Steaua București and was starting to be integrated into the first team squad, he was diagnosed with Wolff–Parkinson–White syndrome, a heart disorder that did not allow him to play professional sports, thus he had to put and end to his playing career without making a single appearance.

Coaching career
Teja decided to finish his studies and got a master's degree and a doctorate at the National University of Physical Education and Sport. While at college, he returned to football and joined Dinamo București, where he became youth coach at the club's academy. While there, he met Walter Zenga, who recommended him to Coverciano, where he got degrees as a football manager and a fitness coach.

After Coverciano, he returned to Dinamo, where he was assistant manager at the second team of the club. In 2006, Teja began a collaboration with Mircea Rednic, helping him as assistant and fitness coach at FC Vaslui and Dinamo București. After that he moved to Steaua București, where he was the assistant coach of Marius Lăcătuș, Dorinel Munteanu and Cristiano Bergodi.

In 2010, after Ilie Dumitrescu was named the head coach of Steaua and came with his own technical staff, Teja left the club and was reunited with Mircea Rednic, at Khazar Lankaran. They returned to Romania in 2012, at Petrolul Ploiești, and then they moved to Belgium, at Standard Liège. In 2013, Teja separated from Rednic and joined Astra Giurgiu, under the management of Daniel Isăilă.

Managerial career
He made his debut as head coach at the Liga I side Universitatea Cluj in October 2013. He ended his contract in September 2014.

In November 2014, Teja was appointed head coach of the Romania national under-21 team. He managed the team for a friendly game against Serbia U21, in Belgrade, won by Romania 1–0. After only one game in charge, he ended his contract with the Romanian Football Federation. In January 2015, Teja signed a contract with Dinamo București, but was sacked only two months later.

In December 2018, after a good first half of the season with Gaz Metan Mediaș, Teja accepted a one and a half year contract offer from FCSB, following the departure of former coach Nicolae Dică.

On 9 January 2020, Teja replaced Bergodi as the head coach of Liga I side Voluntari.

Managerial statistics

References

External links

1978 births
Living people
Footballers from Bucharest
Romanian footballers
Association football midfielders
Romanian football managers
FC Universitatea Cluj managers
FC Dinamo București managers
CS Pandurii Târgu Jiu managers
CS Gaz Metan Mediaș managers
FC Steaua București managers
FC Politehnica Iași (2010) managers
FC Voluntari managers
FC Botoșani managers
Liga I managers
Liga II managers